The 1936 Greenock by-election was a by-election held on 26 November 1936 for the House of Commons constituency of Greenock in Renfrewshire, Scotland.

Vacancy 
The seat had become vacant on 13 October 1936 when the Secretary of State for Scotland, Sir Godfrey Collins had died at the age of 61. A National Liberal Member of Parliament (MP), he had held the seat since the January 1910 general election.

Candidates 
The National Liberal candidate was V. E. Cornelius, who had not previously contested a parliamentary election.

His only opponent was the Labour Party candidate, 50-year-old Robert Gibson.  Gibson had unsuccessfully contested one by-election and three general elections most recently at Dundee in 1935.

Result 
On a high turnout, the result was a victory for Gibson, who won the seat with a swing of nearly 8%. He held the seat until his resignation in 1941.

Votes

See also
Greenock (UK Parliament constituency)
Greenock
1941 Greenock by-election
1955 Greenock by-election
List of United Kingdom by-elections (1931–1950)

Sources 

By-elections to the Parliament of the United Kingdom in Scottish constituencies
1936 in Scotland
1930s elections in Scotland
1936 elections in the United Kingdom
Politics of Inverclyde